The Waxhaw–Weddington Roads Historic District is a national historic district located at Monroe, Union County, North Carolina.  It encompasses 18 contributing buildings, 2 contributing structures, and 1 contributing object in a predominantly residential section of Monroe.  The district developed between about 1897 and 1940 and includes notable examples of Prairie School, Queen Anne, and Classical Revival architecture styles and includes work by architects Charles Christian Hook and by G. Marion Tucker. Notable buildings include the Redwine Tenant House (1907), Robert B. Redwine House (1908), Heath House (1897), Edward Crow House (1916), and Crow's Nest (c. 1905).

It was listed on the National Register of Historic Places in 1988.

References

Historic districts on the National Register of Historic Places in North Carolina
Queen Anne architecture in North Carolina
Neoclassical architecture in North Carolina
Geography of Union County, North Carolina
Buildings and structures in Union County, North Carolina
National Register of Historic Places in Union County, North Carolina